In the mathematical theory of categories, a sketch is a category D, together with a set of cones intended to be limits and a set of cocones intended to be colimits.  A model of the sketch in a category C is a functor
 
that takes each specified cone to a limit cone in C and each specified cocone to a colimit cocone in C.  Morphisms of models are natural transformations.  Sketches are a general way of specifying structures on the objects of a category, forming a category-theoretic analog to the logical concept of a theory and its models. They allow multisorted models and models in any category.

Sketches were invented in 1968 by Charles Ehresmann, using a different but equivalent definition.  There are still other definitions in the research literature.

References
.
.
.
.
.
.

External links
 Sketches: Outline with references (updated 2009).
 

Category theory